Mary Ewing Outerbridge (February 16, 1852 – May 3, 1886) was an American woman who imported the lawn game tennis to the United States from Bermuda.

Biography
Mary was born in Philadelphia, Pennsylvania to Bermudians Alexander Ewing Outerbridge (1816–1900) and Laura Catherine Harvey (1818–1867), who had married in Paget, Bermuda, in 1840, and had moved their growing family to the United States from Pembroke, Bermuda, before her birth. Four of her siblings had been born in Bermuda: Albert Albouy Outerbridge (1841-); Sir Joseph Outerbridge (1843-1933); August Emelius Outerbridge (1846–January 14, 1921); Catherine Tucker Outerbridge (1846-). Her other siblings were Harriett Harvey Outerbridge; Alexander Ewing Outerbridge II; Laura Catharine Outerbridge; Adolph John Harvey Outerbridge (1858–May 29, 1928) and Eugenius Harvey Outerbridge, who was the first president of the Port Authority of New York and New Jersey.

The modern game of lawn tennis was first commercialized in 1874 in England by Major Walter Clopton Wingfield of the British Army. One of the Major's men brought the rules for the game and the equipment with him when he was posted to the Bermuda Garrison in 1874. Mary played the game at "Clermont", her family's house with a large flat lawn in Paget parish in Bermuda. In 1874 Mary returned from Bermuda aboard the ship "S.S. Canima." The sporting equipment was originally confiscated by customs officials, but then her brother managed to have the supplies released. She introduced lawn tennis to the United States. She set up the first tennis court in the United States on the grounds of the Staten Island Cricket and Baseball Club, which was near where the Staten Island Ferry Terminal is today. The club was founded on or about March 22, 1872. She played the first tennis game in the US against her sister Laura in Staten Island, New York, on an hourglass-shaped court.

In September 1880 the Staten Island Cricket and Baseball Club held "the tournament for the championship of America".  The match was won by O. E. Woodhouse of England who was in New York at the time.  Woodhouse defeated I. F. Hellmuth in the championship finals.

Several other clubs held similar tournaments in the same year. In the same year tennis was also introduced in Arizona.

In 1880 Mary and her parents were living in the Castleton area of Staten Island, New York City and her father was working as a clerk, as was her brother, Adolph. The family had two servants.

She died in 1886 at age 34 in the New Brighton section of Staten Island and was buried in Silver Mount Cemetery, Staten Island, next to her parents.

Legacy
Mary Outerbridge was inducted into the International Tennis Hall of Fame in 1981.  She was inducted into the Staten Island Sports Hall of Fame in 1999.

In 2018, the New York Times published a belated obituary for her  as part of the Overlooked history project.

See also
 James Dwight
 History of tennis
 1880 Men's Tennis Tour

Footnotes

Further reading
 Amisha Padnani, "Mary Ewing Outerbridge, 1852-1886," New York Times, March 8, 2018.

External links
Findagrave: Mary Outerbridge
International Tennis Hall of Fame

American tennis people
Tennis people from Pennsylvania
International Tennis Hall of Fame inductees
American people of Bermudian descent
Sportspeople from Philadelphia
Sportspeople from Staten Island
1852 births
1886 deaths
History of tennis